Johnny Hall (14 May 1917 – 24 September 2009) was an  Australian rules footballer who played with Hawthorn in the Victorian Football League (VFL).

Notes

External links 

1917 births
2009 deaths
Australian rules footballers from Victoria (Australia)
Hawthorn Football Club players